The 2013 European Trophy was the fourth and final season of the European Trophy, an annually held European ice hockey tournament. It was also the eighth tournament since its predecessor, the Nordic Trophy, was launched in 2006. The regulation round began on 6 August 2013 with the South Division game between Piráti Chomutov–Sparta Praha, and ended on 8 September 2013. The playoffs were played between 19 and 22 December 2013 in Berlin. The preliminary schedule for the regulation round was released on 15 April 2013.

JYP won the tournament, defeating Färjestad BK in the final 2–1. Like last year's tournament, the same 32 teams participated in the tournament, marking the first time since 2007 that the teams remained the same from last year. For the first time in tournament history, Eisbären Berlin hosted the playoffs, the Red Bulls Salute. It marked the first time that the playoffs were hosted in a single city, as well as the first time that the playoffs weren't hosted in Austria.

Tournament format 
The 32 teams in the tournament were, partly based on geographical location, divided into four divisions: the West Division, the North Division, the South Division, and the East Division. Each division consisted of 8 teams who played a round-robin in their division, with an extra game against a local rival in their division, giving a total of 8 games per team. Each team was assigned four home games as well as four road games. The match-ups were nearly identical to last year, the only difference being that the home–away team assignings were switched for each game. Six teams qualified for the playoffs: Eisbären Berlin (as host), the winner of each division, and the best 2nd-placed team of all four divisions.

If at least two teams in the same division or at least two 2nd-placed teams ended up tied in points, the following tie-breaker format was used:
Best goal difference
Most goals scored in total (goals for)
Results in games against the tied teams
Drawing of lots

Playing format 
If a game was tied after regulation time (60 minutes), a 5-minute overtime period was played. During overtime, both teams substitute only 4 players on the ice at once (except for 3 when either of the teams has a penalized player). If no team scores during the overtime period, a shootout was played, starting with three penalty shots for both teams. If the shootout remains tied after the first three rounds, sudden death rounds were played until a winning team has been determined.

In the regulation round games, the teams get three points for a regulation-time victory, two points for an overtime/shootout win, one point for losing in overtime/shootout, and zero points for a regulation loss.

Prize money 
After the regulation round, the four division winners receive €25 000 each, the four second-placed teams €20 000, and the third, fourth and fifth team of each division receive €15 000, €10 000, and €5 000, respectively. Additionally, in the Red Bulls Salute, the winning team receives €50 000, while the team finishing second gets €10 000. In total, €360 000 was given out during the entire tournament.

Participating clubs 

Note (*): the stated home arenas don't have to be used in the European Trophy tournament.
Note (**): SC Bern and ZSC Lions did not participate in 2011.

Rivalries 
West Division
HIFK vs. Jokerit
Färjestad BK vs. Frölunda Indians
ERC Ingolstadt vs. Adler Mannheim
EV Zug vs. ZSC Lions
North Division
Oulun Kärpät vs. Luleå HF
Eisbären Berlin vs. Hamburg Freezers
Škoda Plzeň vs. Kometa Brno
Red Bull Salzburg vs. Mountfield HK
South Division
JYP vs. KalPa
HV71 vs. Linköpings HC
Sparta Praha vs. Piráti Chomutov
Slovan Bratislava vs. Vienna Capitals
East Division
TPS vs. Tappara
Djurgårdens IF vs. Brynäs IF
ČSOB Pojišťovna Pardubice vs. Bílí Tygři Liberec
Fribourg-Gottéron vs. SC Bern

Regulation round

North Division 
Final standings. Eisbären Berlin qualified for the playoffs as the host team.

East Division 
Final standings.

South Division 
Final standings.

West Division 
Final standings.

Ranking of runner-up teams 
To determine the last playoff spot (along with playoff host Eisbären Berlin and the four group winners), a ranking between the group runners-up was made, and the best runner-up got a place in the playoffs.

Final standings of runners-up of divisions:

Playoffs 

The playoffs, known as the Red Bulls Salute, took place in the Wellblechpalast and the O2 World, Berlin between 19 and 22 December 2013. It was played with two groups of three teams each. The teams played a round-robin in their group, for a total of three games, and the best-seeded team from each group qualified for the Final; all other teams were eliminated from the tournament. The groups were determined by a draw taking place in Berlin on 9 September 2013. The first game in each group took place in the Wellblechpalast; all other games, including the Final, were played in the O2 World.

The teams in the playoffs were:
  Eisbären Berlin (Host)
  Luleå HF (Winner of North Division)
  Djurgårdens IF (Winner of East Division)
  JYP (Winner of South Division)
  Färjestad BK (Winner of West Division)
  Frölunda Indians (Best runner-up)

Groups

Group A

Games

Group B

Games

Final 

Time is local (UTC+1).

Ranking and statistics

Tournament awards

Final standings 
The following is the final standings of the playoffs. Note that due to the playoff groups, the standings for the teams that failed to qualify for the Final were determined by their records in the playoff groups.

Scoring leaders 

List shows the top 10 skaters sorted by points, then goals.

GP = Games played; G = Goals; A = Assists; Pts = Points; PIM = Penalties in minutes; POS = Position  positions: F = Forward; D = DefencemanSource: Europeantrophy.com

Leading goaltenders 

List shows the top 10 goaltenders, based on save percentage, who have played at least 40% of their team's minutes. If two goaltenders has the same save percentage the order is based on number shots against.
TOI = Time on ice (minutes:seconds); SA = Shots against; GA = Goals against; GAA = Goals against average; Sv% = Save percentage; SO = ShutoutsSources: Europeantrophy.com and Eurohockey.com

European Star Award leaders

The European Star Award was a three stars award given to the three best players in each game. The first star got three points, the second got two points, and the third got one point. List shows the top ten players based on the number of European Star Award points.
GP = Games played; Pts = Points; POS = Position  positions: G = Goaltender; F = Forward; D = DefencemanSource: Europeantrophy.com

References

External links 
European Trophy's website
European Trophy schedule
Red Bulls Salute's website

European Trophy
1